Bundeena is a village on the outskirts of southern Sydney, in the state of New South Wales, Australia. Bundeena is located 29 km south of the Sydney central business district and is part of the local government area of the Sutherland Shire.

Bundeena is adjacent to the village of Maianbar and lies on the southern side of Port Hacking, opposite the suburbs of Cronulla and Burraneer. The village is surrounded by the Royal National Park.

The beaches at Bundeena are Jibbon Beach, Gunyah Beach, Horderns Beach and Bonnie Vale Beach. Cabbage Tree Creek and 'The Basin' separate Bundeena from the smaller village of Maianbar. A bush track and footbridge link the two villages. Bonnie Vale is also one of the few camp grounds within the Royal National Park.

Transport

Bundeena may be reached by passenger ferry from Cronulla or by road through the Royal National Park from Sutherland or Waterfall. Cronulla and National Park Ferry Cruises provides regular ferry services between Cronulla and Bundeena. The wharf at Cronulla is located on Gunnamatta Bay, near Cronulla railway station. Ferry trips vary from 20 to 30 minutes depending on the weather. Many people from Bundeena drive to the railway station at Sutherland, as it is only a 25-minute drive as opposed to 30 minutes by ferry to Cronulla and then a 15-minute train trip to Sutherland.

Maianbar Bundeena Bus Service operates bus route 989 for local bus services between Bundeena and Maianbar on school days only. In addition there is one return trip every Wednesday to Engadine and one return trip every Friday to Miranda both via Maianbar.

Environment
During early colonial settlement, Indonesian rusa deer were introduced and have since become a large population in the area. Many residents see the deer as pests, but they are a protected species, although the National Parks & Wildlife Service are permitted a small yearly cull. However many residents also take delight in the deer, which causes much division and emotion in the affected townships.

History

Bundeena is an Aboriginal word meaning "noise like thunder" (presumed to be a reference to the sound of the waves crashing on Horderns Beach). Aboriginal rock engravings made by Dharawal people can be found at Jibbon Head.

Bass and Flinders investigated the area in 1796, deciding that it was not a suitable location for a settlement. In 1815 there were reports of criminals in the Cabbage Tree Creek region who were producing sly grog. They used the caves along the foreshore for storage.

Bundeena's first authorised white settler, Owen Byrne, was granted land at the site in 1832. George Simpson received a land grant at the adjacent Bonnie Vale in 1863. Simpson's Hotel was opened in the area now known as Simpsons Bay by George's son, William, in the 1870s. The sandstone Simpson's House (1870s) is still standing at what is now Bonnie Vale Campground.

A wharf was built in 1890 and W.A. Hodgkinson conducted a launch service from Gunnamatta Bay in 1908. Captain R.R. Ryall commenced the Cronulla to Bundeena ferry service in 1915. The Wharf was reconstructed in 1920. The district's first store commenced operations at the beginning of the 1930s. Bundeena Public School opened on 14 September 1948.

Education
Bundeena Public School began in September 1948, with classes initially held in the RSL hall. Bundeena Library operates out of Bundeena Public School on Mondays and Wednesdays after school hours and Saturday mornings.

Sport 
Bundeena is home to the soccer club Bundeena-Mainbar FC, who play at Bundeena Oval. Bundeena Oval also hosts Bundeena Little Athletics.

Demographics
According to the 2016 census of Population, there were 1,919 residents in Bundeena. 76.2% of people were born in Australia. The next most common country of birth was England at 6.9%. 89.7% of people only spoke English at home. The most common responses for religion were No Religion 39.2%, Catholic 22.4% and Anglican 14.8%.

References

External links 

 Bundeena.com.au
 Bundeena Info
 Aboriginal Sites In Bundeena

Suburbs of Sydney
Sutherland Shire
Coastal towns in New South Wales